Aleksandre Mirtskhulava or Aleksandr Iordanovich Mirtskhulava (May 12, 1911 – June 9, 2009) was a Georgian politician who was the First Secretary of the Communist Party of the Georgian SSR from 14 April to 20 September 1953.

Mirtskhulava was born in the village of Khorga in the Khobi District of Samegrelo-Zemo Svaneti. In 1930, he graduated from the Pedagogical Technical School of Zugdidi. By 1931 he was a raikom secretary; he became First Secretary of the Communist Union of Mtskheta in 1933 and of Khoni in 1935. From 1941 to 1943 he was the second secretary of the Communist Party of Abkhazia, and from 1943 to 1947 Chairman of the Council of Ministers of Abkhazia, in effect head of the government of Abkhazia.

Mirtskhulava was Lavrenty Beria's Komsomol chairman and a strong supporter of Beria, and when Beria briefly took power after the death of Joseph Stalin, he restored his clients who suffered during the Mingrelian Affair and appointed Mirtskhulava as First Secretary of the Georgian Party. Mirtskhulava was removed from the Central Committee bureau and expelled from the CC by a CC plenum held on September 20, 1953.

From 1953 until 1980 he held various responsible posts in the agricultural sector in Georgia.

References 

1911 births
2009 deaths
People from Samegrelo-Zemo Svaneti
Mingrelians
First Secretaries of the Georgian Communist Party
Recipients of the Order of Lenin
First convocation members of the Supreme Soviet of the Soviet Union
Second convocation members of the Supreme Soviet of the Soviet Union
Third convocation members of the Supreme Soviet of the Soviet Union